A power canal refers to a canal used for hydraulic power generation, rather than for transport of watercraft. The power canal was a major factor in the Industrial revolution in New England in the 19th century. Most early power canals were mill races used mechanically to transfer power directly from falling water to machinery in mill buildings. Later, the hydraulic power generated electricity locally for the same mill factories. These power canals were often filled in as electricity (transported by power lines) replaced the need for local water power, and road transport needs or city expansion needs reclaimed the land. Some hydraulic power canals were transformed into local electric generators, but most were closed. Remains of power canals can be seen in old mill towns and are often protected as historical structures today.

United States

California 
 California Powder Works (1864-1914)

Maine 
 Cumberland and Oxford Canal (1871-1905) was originally a transport canal from 1832

Massachusetts 
 Holyoke Canal System (1827)
 Merrimack Canal (1820s)
 Lowell Power Canal System and Pawtucket Gatehouse (1821)
 Turners Falls Canal (1869) was originally a transport canal from 1798

Michigan 
 Edison Sault Power Canal

New Hampshire 
 Nashua power canal (1826), part of Mine Falls Park
 Amoskeag Falls power canal originally dug for transport in 1807

New York 
 Niagara Falls Hydraulic Power and Manufacturing Company (1862)
 Rockland Mill Complex (c.1850)

Ohio
 Great Western Powder Works (1877)

Notes 

Canals
History of New England